or Naruto Otsuka Sports Park Pocari Sweat Stadium is a multi-purpose stadium in Naruto, Tokushima, Japan. The stadium is named after Pocari Sweat.

Its original name was Tokushima Naruto Stadium, which was renamed by the naming rights by Otsuka Pharmaceutical and after its product Pocari Sweat.

It is currently used mostly for football matches. It serves as a home ground of Tokushima Vortis. The stadium holds 17,924 people since the most recent renovation works.

References

External links 
 

Football venues in Japan
Athletics (track and field) venues in Japan
Rugby union stadiums in Japan
Multi-purpose stadiums in Japan
Tokushima Vortis
Sports venues in Tokushima Prefecture
Naruto, Tokushima
Sports venues completed in 1971
1971 establishments in Japan